Tonkinacris is a genus of grasshoppers in the family Acrididae, subfamily Melanoplinae, tribe Podismini Jacobson, 1905 and subtribe Tonkinacridina Ito, 2015. The recorded distribution of species is in East Asia: including southern China and Vietnam.

Species
The Orthoptera Species File lists:
Tonkinacris damingshanus Li, Lu, Jiang & Meng, 1991
Tonkinacris decoratus Carl, 1916 - type species - locality: "Than-Moi" (probably in Lạng Sơn province), Vietnam.
Tonkinacris meridionalis Li, 1986
Tonkinacris ruficerus Ito, 1999
Tonkinacris sinensis Chang, 1937
Tonkinacris yaeyamaensis Ito, 1999

References

External links
 Picture of Tonkinacris decoratus on www.ecotourismus.de (retrieved 25 November 2018)
 

Acrididae genera
Orthoptera of Indo-China